Benoît Peeters (born 1956) is a French comics writer, novelist, and comics studies scholar.

Biography
After a degree in Philosophy at Université de Paris I, Peeters prepared his Master's at the École des Hautes Études en Sciences Sociales (EHESS‚ Paris) under the direction of Roland Barthes. He holds a habilitation à diriger les recherches (HDR), i.e. a supplementary PhD enabling him to supervise the work of PhD candidates (Université de Paris I, 2007).

He published his first novel, Omnibus, by Les Éditions de Minuit in 1976, followed by his second, La Bibliothèque de Villers, Robert Laffont, 1980. Since then, he has published over sixty works on a wide variety of subjects.

His best-known work is Les Cités obscures, an imaginary world which mingles a Borgesian metaphysical surrealism with the detailed architectural vistas of the series' artist, François Schuiten.  The series began with Les Murailles de Samaris (The Walls of Samaris) in 1983 and is still continuing.

He has also worked with Frédéric Boilet on a series of comic albums, including Love Hotel (1993), Tokyo est mon jardin (1997), and Demi-tour (1997), and has collaborated on a series of photographic works with Marie-Françoise Plissart.

He has written a number of books about the comics medium as well, including Le monde d'Hergé (1983), published in English as Tintin and the World of Hergé (1988), a biography of Hergé, Hergé, Son of Tintin, a study of comics pioneer Rodolphe Töpffer, and theoretical works such as Lire la bande dessinée (1998).

His interest in the cinema has increased over the years. He is the author of three short films as well as several documentaries. He directed one feature film‚ Le Dernier plan (The Last Shot)‚ and long conversations with Alain Robbe-Grillet.

He published the first biography of Jacques Derrida. The book was translated into English by Polity Press in 2012.

In 2015 Peeters was appointed as the UK's first ever comics professor at the University of Lancaster.

Notes

External links

 A short biography 
 Fan site

1956 births
Living people
Writers from Paris
Comics critics
20th-century French novelists
21st-century French novelists
Tintin
French male novelists
Inkpot Award winners